Samir Khenyab is an Iraqi boxer. He competed at the 1980 Summer Olympics and the 1984 Summer Olympics. At the 1984 Summer Olympics, he lost to Hugh Russell of Ireland.

References

Year of birth missing (living people)
Living people
Iraqi male boxers
Olympic boxers of Iraq
Boxers at the 1980 Summer Olympics
Boxers at the 1984 Summer Olympics
Place of birth missing (living people)
Flyweight boxers
Lightweight boxers